Jorge Campos (born 1966) is a Mexican football goalkeeper

Jorge Campos may also refer to:

Jorge Campos (Paraguayan footballer) (born 1970), Paraguayan football attacking midfielder
Jorge Campos (footballer, born 1979), Mexican football midfielder and manager
Jorge Campos (table tennis) (born 1991), Cuban table tennis player